Io sono (which translates to “I am”) is a 2021 artwork by Italian artist Salvatore Garau. The work consists of an immaterial sculpture.

For Garau, the sculpture assets its conformation in its own nothingness. 

Io Sono, which was initial valued at €6,000-9,000, sold at auction for €15,000.

References

2021 works
Conceptual art
Sculpture
Works by Italian people